Elections to Manchester Borough Council were held in 1946.  One third of the council was up for election, although there were many additional vacancies. The council stayed under Labour Party control.

After the election, the composition of the council was

Labour Party (Labour)
Liberal Party (Liberal)
Green Party (Green)
Independent Candidates (Ind, Ind1, Ind2...)
Conservative Party (Cons)
Respect – The Unity Coalition (Respect)
United Kingdom Independence Party (UKIP)
British National Party (BNP)

Candidates and Ward Results
Below is a list of the 36 individual wards with the candidates standing in those wards and the number of votes the candidates acquired. The winning candidate per ward is in bold.

Crumpsall Ward

	
	
	

1946
Manchester
1940s in Manchester